Erlenbach ZH is a railway station in Switzerland, situated near to the banks of Lake Zurich in the municipality of Erlenbach. The station is on the Lake Zurich right bank railway line.

The station is served by the following passenger trains:

References

External links 

Erlenbach ZH station on Swiss Federal Railway's web site

Railway stations in the canton of Zürich
Swiss Federal Railways stations
Erlenbach, Switzerland